Bruno Fait (7 July 1924 – 18 May 2000) was an Italian racewalker who competed in the 1952 Summer Olympics.

After his sport career he emigrated to France and became a writer.

Achievements

References

External links
 

1924 births
2000 deaths
Italian male racewalkers
Olympic athletes of Italy
Athletes (track and field) at the 1952 Summer Olympics
Sportspeople from Trento
20th-century Italian people